Salsipuedes Creek is a  southward-flowing stream originating about  east of Watsonville in Santa Cruz County, California. Most of the upper reach was the historic Laguna Grande, now referred to as College Lake.

History
In 1817 Spanish Governor Pablo Vicente de Solá granted the Mission Santa Cruz padres the right to pasture their horses at the "Bolsa de Sals si puedes five-and-a-half leagues from the Villa de Branciforte". This bolsa, Spanish for pocket of marshland, was College Lake, named after the polite nickname "The College" for the Roman Catholic Orphan Asylum built nearby in 1869. College Lake (and later College Road) get their names from this nickname. In 1924, Reclamation District Two was created, and the lake was pumped dry to create more farmland. The USGS survey maps show College Lake as an "intermittent lake." "Salsipuedes" was a Spanish language expression meaning "get out if you can" often used for rough terrain.

Watershed and Course 
Salsipuedes Creek above College Road is College Lake, and from there perhaps only  of stream from its origin just above Carlton Road. However, it has a significant tributary, Casserly Creek. Casserly Creek terminates in a large marsh just south of Interlaken, California, which drains into College Lake. Below College Lake, Salsipuedes Creek is joined by Corralitos Creek just south of College Road, as delineated on USGS maps, however others have suggested that Salsipuedes Creek is instead tributary to Corralitos Creek. From its confluence with Corralitos Creek, Salsipuedes Creek flows  to the Pajaro River.

Ecology and Conservation 
In a 2007 report, Dr. Jerry Smith reported steelhead trout of all age classes in both Casserly Creek and Corralitos Creek.

References

External links
 Pajaro River Watershed Flood Prevention Authority
  Pajaro Watershed Web Portal

Rivers of Santa Cruz County, California
Rivers of the San Francisco Bay Area
Rivers of Northern California